In Your House (known as  NXT In Your House beginning in 2022) is a professional wrestling series of events created by WWE, a professional wrestling promotion based in Connecticut. The events originally aired on pay-per-view (PPV) from May 1995 to February 1999 when the promotion was still called the World Wrestling Federation (WWF). In 2020, WWE revived In Your House as a subseries of the NXT brand's TakeOver events, which aired on the WWE Network in addition to traditional pay-per-view and Peacock, the latter two with the 2021 event. The NXT TakeOver series was discontinued in September 2021, but In Your House continued on as NXT's annual June event.

The original concept of the In Your House series was that in the months when the promotion was not holding one of its major PPV events, they would offer a two-hour PPV for a lower price. In Your House was established in response to a move by competitor World Championship Wrestling (WCW) to increase their annual pay-per-view events. The In Your House branding was retired following February 1999's St. Valentine's Day Massacre: In Your House event, as the company moved to install permanent names for each of its monthly events, which began with Backlash. After 21 years, in response to the COVID-19 pandemic, WWE revived In Your House for the promotion's developmental brand, NXT, and it has since been held annually in June.

History
The first In Your House pay-per-view (PPV) was held on May 14, 1995, in Syracuse, New York at Upstate Medical University Arena (then known as Oncenter War Memorial Arena). To promote this first event, the World Wrestling Federation (WWF, now WWE) held a sweepstakes to give away a new house in Orlando, Florida. The original concept of In Your House was that in the months when the WWF was not holding one of its then-five major PPV events (WrestleMania, King of the Ring, SummerSlam, Survivor Series, and Royal Rumble, which at the time ran for three hours and retailed for US$29.95), they would offer a two-hour PPV, priced at US$14.95. The price was raised to US$19.95 starting in December 1995 with In Your House 5. The WWF did this in response to a move by competitor World Championship Wrestling (WCW) to increase their annual pay-per-view events (in 1995, WCW held 9 PPV events, then 10 in 1996, and finally started airing monthly events in 1997). Notwithstanding the addition of more WWF events, WCW's events regularly ran between 2.5–3 hours. Starting with Ground Zero: In Your House in September 1997, the WWF expanded all of its In Your House events to three hours, thus matching the runtime of its major PPV events.

The first six In Your House events were not promoted with subtitles, which were retroactively added (shown below in the table in small print), sometimes making use of a tagline. The first event to officially use a subtitle was the seventh event, In Your House 7: Good Friends, Better Enemies. From September 1997 onwards, the subtitles replaced the In Your House label as the main titles (e.g., the PPV was not named "In Your House: Ground Zero", but instead, "Ground Zero: In Your House"), until regular named shows such as Backlash took over in 1999. The In Your House branding was retired following February 1999's St. Valentine's Day Massacre: In Your House event, as the company moved to install permanent names for each of its monthly events, which began with Backlash. Early advertising for that year's Backlash featured the "In Your House" branding until it was quietly dropped in the weeks leading to the pay-per-view. Following this, several of the In Your House shows were rebranded as their own PPV chronologies, including Over the Edge, Fully Loaded, Unforgiven, No Way Out, Judgment Day, and Bad Blood.

In 2002, the WWF was renamed to World Wrestling Entertainment (WWE), and in 2011, the promotion ceased using its full name, with WWE becoming an orphaned initialism. On May 13, 2020, WWE announced that the In Your House branding would be revived for the NXT brand division as an NXT TakeOver event entitled TakeOver: In Your House on June 7, which aired exclusively on WWE's online streaming service, the WWE Network. The announcement and the event marked the 25th anniversary of the first In Your House PPV. The event featured homages to the WWF in the early 90's, including a recreation of the house-themed stage used during the earlier In Your House events, and Adam Cole appearing in a parody of the commercials for ICOPRO bodybuilding supplements. A second TakeOver: In Your House was scheduled for June 13, 2021, thus making In Your House an annual subseries of TakeOver events. This second event aired on both the WWE Network and traditional pay-per-view, thus returning In Your House to pay-per-view. It also aired on Peacock after the American version of the WWE Network merged under Peacock in March 2021, thus being the first In Your House to air on Peacock.

In September 2021, NXT was rebranded as NXT 2.0, returning the brand to its original function as WWE's developmental territory. The NXT TakeOver series was subsequently discontinued; however, In Your House continued on as NXT's annual June event.

Events

References

See also 
 TNA One Night Only
 NXT TakeOver series

 
Recurring events established in 1995
Recurring events disestablished in 1999